Sphaerolobium benetectum is a species of flowering plant in the family Fabaceae and is endemic to the south-west of Western Australia. It is tuft-forming sub-shrub with erect stems, linear to lance-shaped leaves, and yellow-orange and pink to red flowers.

Description

Taxonomy and naming
Sphaerolobium benetectum was first formally described in 2001 by Ryonen Butcher in the journal Nuytsia from specimens collected near Collie in 1999. The specific epithet (benetectum) means "well hidden" referring to the difficulty of detecting the species.

Distribution and habitat
This species grows in winter-wet areas near swamps and in low shrubland in three disjunct areas, near Collie, near Augusta and near Mount Lindesay.

Conservation status
Sphaerolobium benetectum is listed as "Priority Two" by the Western Australian Government Department of Biodiversity, Conservation and Attractions, meaning that it is poorly known and from only one or a few locations.

References

benetectum
Eudicots of Western Australia
Plants described in 2001